Thomas Jackson was an American baseball pitcher in the Negro leagues.  He played with the St. Louis Stars in 1926 and 1927, the Memphis Red Sox in 1927, the Cleveland Tigers in 1928, and the Nashville Elite Giants in 1929.

References

External links
 and Baseball-Reference Black Baseball stats and Seamheads

Cleveland Tigers (baseball) players
Memphis Red Sox players
Nashville Elite Giants players
St. Louis Stars (baseball) players
Year of birth unknown
Year of death unknown
Baseball pitchers